The Egyptian Arab Union Party  is a political party in Egypt.

References

2011 establishments in Egypt
2012 disestablishments in Egypt
Arab nationalism in Egypt
Arab nationalist political parties
Nationalist parties in Egypt
Political parties disestablished in 2012
Political parties established in 2011